Heavy D (1967-2011) was a Jamaican-American rapper, singer, and actor.

Heavy D may also refer to:

Colin Newell (1973–2020), British reality television personality who was known as Heavy D
Heavy D!, character in The King of Fighters
A nickname of professional wrestler Don Harris from The Harris Brothers